Davel is a settlement in the Mpumalanga province of South Africa. It is situated next to the N17 highway in the south-west of the province between the larger towns of Bethal and Ermelo.

It is also the site of a Sentech VHF transmitter.

References

Populated places in the Msukaligwa Local Municipality